Gianfranco Gazzana Priaroggia  was the name of at least two ships of the Italian Navy named in honour of Gianfranco Gazzana-Priaroggia and may refer to:

 , a  launched in 1948 as the USS Volador. Transferred to Italy and renamed in 1972, she was struck in 1981. 
 , a  launched in 1993. 

Italian Navy ship names